Krayton D. Kerns (born April 26, 1957 in Sheridan, Wyoming) is a Republican member of the Montana Legislature.  He was elected to House District 58 which represents a part of the Yellowstone County area.

In 2009 he successfully sponsored House Bill 228, a controversial castle doctrine bill supported by the National Rifle Association, which, among others, allows a person at home to use deadly force in the face of any perceived threat.

References

1957 births
Colorado State University alumni
Living people
Republican Party members of the Montana House of Representatives
University of Wyoming alumni